Graphium tamerlana is a butterfly found in China that belongs to the swallowtail family.

Description
It is similar to Iphiclides podalirius. The black band at the apex of the cell of the forewing reaches only to the median vein, not extending beyond it to the hind angle, being exactly as in Graphium alebion, but in contradistinction to this insect, the orange anal spot on the hindwing of is reduced to two small obscure dots.

Subspecies
Graphium tamerlana tamerlana
Graphium tamerlana taliensis (O. Bang-Haas, 1927) (Yunnan)

Etymology
It was named to honour the Turkic ruler Tamerlane.

References

Tamer
Butterflies of Asia
Endemic fauna of China
Butterflies described in 1876
Taxa named by Charles Oberthür